Naga, officially the City of Naga, is a 5th class component city in the province of Cebu, Philippines. According to the 2020 census, it has a population of 133,184 people.

Naga City is bordered to the north by the town of Minglanilla, to the west is the city of Toledo, to the east is the Cebu Strait, and to the south is the town of San Fernando.

It lies within the Cebu metropolitan area.

It is one of the two Philippine cities named Naga, the other being Naga, Camarines Sur in Luzon.

History 

Naga was previously named by the first settlers as "Narra" due to the abundance of trees called "narra". The name eventually became to what is now known as "Naga". Naga became a municipality on June 12, 1829.

Cityhood

Cityhood was ratified in a plebiscite on September 2, 2007. The Supreme Court declared the cityhood law of Naga and 15 other cities unconstitutional after a petition filed by the League of Cities of the Philippines in its ruling on November 18, 2008. On December 22, 2009, the cityhood law of Naga and 15 other municipalities regain its status as cities again after the court reversed its ruling November 18, 2008 ruling.

On August 23, 2010, the court reinstated its ruling on November 18, 2008, making Naga and 15 other cities regular municipalities. Finally, on February 15, 2011, Naga and the other 15 municipalities declared that the conversion to cityhood met all legal requirements.
In 2013, after six years of legal battle, in its board resolution the League of Cities of the Philippines acknowledged and recognized the cityhood of Naga and 15 other cities on July 19, 2013.

Geography

Barangays 

Naga comprises 28 barangays:

Climate

Demographics

Economy

Naga is home to several heavy industries, and as such, the city bills itself as the Industrial City of the South. (feedmill), among other industries.

The Naga Valley Industrial Park (NAVA) is a  Philippine Economic Zone Authority (PEZA)-registered industrial park in Barangay Cantao-an. Locators in NAVA include Cebu Mitsumi, Inc., Kyocera Kinseki Philippines, Inc., and Tokyo Microshaft Corporation. The industrial park was a part of the  New Cebu Township One (NCTO) of MRC Allied before it was acquired by Cebu City-based developer Primary Properties Corporation.

Sports venues
In December 2015, the Naga City government inaugurated the Teodoro Mendiola Sports Field and Oval, located along North Poblacion. Its inauguration was in time for its usage as the main venue for the 2016 Central Visayas Regional Athletic Association (CVIRAA) games in February. The ₱68 million project comprises a track and field oval, swimming pool (Olympic-sized), and basketball, tennis, and volleyball courts.

2017 the first time a host became back-in-back in the venue for the CVIRAA again.

References

Sources

External links
 
 
 [ Philippine Standard Geographic Code]
 

Cities in Cebu
Cities in Metro Cebu
Populated places established in 1829
1829 establishments in the Philippines
Component cities in the Philippines